Muhammad Nabil bin Ahmad Latpi (born 6 September 1992) is a Malaysian professional footballer who plays as a winger for Malaysia Super League side PDRM.

References

External links
 

1992 births
Living people
Malaysian footballers
Malaysia Super League players
Malaysia Premier League players
PDRM FA players
Terengganu FC players
Association football midfielders
Association football wingers
Malaysian people of Malay descent